OTO Awards Winners and nominees

Most wins Adela Vinczeová | 10x  Marcel Merčiak | 9x  Miroslav Žbirka | 7x  Patrik Herman | 7x 

Most nominations Miroslav Žbirka | 16x  Lenka Čviriková | 15x  Patrik Herman | 14x  Marcel Merčiak | 14x  

Special awards not included

With ten awards having received in main categories, Adela Vinczeová is the most successful participant in the so far history of the OTO Awards poll, making her the most voted Entertainer and Host in general. She is followed by Marcel Merčiak who has accumulated nine as trophies as Sports Commentator, while  Miroslav Žbirka and Patrik Herman have each scored seven wins, these as the most favorite Male Singer and TV Journalist, respectively. Herman also holds the record for the highest number of consecutive wins per category.

Including special achievements, Vinczeová leads with fifteen wins in total, while Merčiak with twelve. Besides, he is the only winner having scored at least in two categories per year, both the special (2012) and regular (2015 – 2017). The third participant with the highest number of OTO awards in general, is Actress Zdena Studenková with eight wins.

Within multiple nominees, Žbirka himself remains the most successful to date, having earned sixteen nominations in a row to his credit, all made since the second season of the show. His runners-up are Sportscaster Lenka Čviriková with fifteen nominations, and Herman and Merčiak; the latters with fourteen nominating bids.

Other frequent winner-nominees include Jarmila Lajčáková and Petra Polnišová who both scored in three individual categories at least. While Lajčáková managed to earn her trophies in such fields as Sports Host (2000), Sports Commentator (2001) and News Host (2008), Polnišová is a single winner as Humorist (2007) and triple as Actress; mainly for Comedy.

Janko Kroner for a change, has been the only artist nominated overall in four categories through the years, once as Children's Program Host. Eventually winning twice for performing arts, eleven nominations in total make him the most nominated actor ever, being followed by fellow multiple winners or nominees such as Maroš Kramár, Emília Vášáryová and Polnišová; these with eight nominations each. Based solely on the most nominations with no competitive win, the most notable is Sports Commentator and eleven-time nominee Ján Plesník.

The youngest holder of the award is Marcel Chlpík that won now discontinued category New Actor as seven years old, the oldest actress Magda Paveleková which earned a trophy at the age of eighty-one; upon her induction into the Hall of Fame. In terms of other OTO honorees, Dušan Gabáni and Marika Gombitová are the only non-acting recipients of such award, with Gabáni becoming the first sports commentator ever or presenter as such, and Gombitová as the only music artist in general or else the youngest honoree at fifty-eight. Jozef Kroner, Július Satinský and Leona Kočkovičová have accomplished their awards in memoriam; first as a honoree, the others as regular nominees.

Winners per categories

TV hosts and other presenters

TV actors and other performers

TV programming and special categories

Superlatives

Winners

 10 awards
 Adela Vinczeová (née Banášová)Ю‡

 9 awards
 Marcel MerčiakЮ‡Ž

 7 awards
 Miroslav Žbirka
 Patrik Herman

 6 awards
 Zdena StudenkováЮ
 Lenka Čviriková (née Hriadelová)‡

 5 awards
 Zlatica Švajdová (née Puškárová)
 Mário KollárЮ 
 Lucia Barmošová 

 4 awards
 Jozef Nodžák 
 Jana Kirschner 
 Petra PolnišováЮΨ 
 Peter Varinský‡ 
 Jozef KubániŽ

 3 awards
 Soňa MüllerováЮ
 Jozef Pročko
 Michal Dočolomanský 
 Daniel Krajcer‡ 
 Aneta Parišková
 Martina Šimkovičová (née Bartošíková)‡
 Jarmila Lajčáková (née Hargašová)ЮΨ
 Ján Koleník‡ 
 Lukáš LatinákЮ‡ 
 Celeste Buckingham 
 Fragile
 Adam Ďurica

 2 awards
 Misha 
 Maroš KramárЮ 
 Zuzana Smatanová 
 Peter MarcinЮ‡ 
 Zuzana Fialová 
 Katarína Knechtová 
 Tomáš Maštalír 
 Janko Kroner
 Diana Mórová‡ 
 Andrej Bičan 
 Zuzana Šebová
 Adriana Kmotríková
 Kristína
 Michal Hudák 
 IMT Smile

 1 award
 Eva Černá
 Jozef Ráž
 Marika Gombitová┼ 
 Miroslav Michalech
 Július Satinský†
 Jana Majeská 
 Viliam Rozboril
 Rastislav Žitný
 Emília Vášáryová┼ 
 Martin Rausch 
 Marián Čekovský 
 Nela Pocisková 
 Monika Hilmerová
 Ján Jackuliak 
 Helena Krajčiová
 Marcel Chlpík 
 Ján Mečiar 
 Danica Kleinová 
 Juraj Kemka 
 Daniel Heriban
 Tatiana Pauhofová
 Leona Kočkovičová (née Fučíková)†
 Ľubomír Bajaník
 Kristína Kövešová
 Lujza Garajová Schrameková
 Ondrej Kandráč
 Mária Čírová

 Notes┼ denotes an OTO honoree Ю denotes an overall winner of a ceremony ‡ denotes a winner in two main categories Ψ denotes a winner in three main categories Ž denotes also a winner of the Život Award † denotes an in memoriam-winner

Nominees

 16 nominations
 Miroslav Žbirka

 15 nominations
 Lenka ČvirikováЦ

 14 nominations
 Patrik Herman
 Marcel MerčiakЩ

 13 nominations
 Zlatica ŠvajdováЦ

 12 nominations
 Viliam Rozboril

 11 nominations 
 Janko KronerЩΓ
 Ján PlesníkЦ 
 Adela VinczeováЦ 

 10 nominations
 Zuzana Smatanová
 Peter VarinskýЦ

 9 nominations
 Jana Kirschner

 8 nominations
 Maroš Kramár 
 Daniel KrajcerЦ
 Emília Vášáryová┼Ц 
 Martin RauschЦ 
 Petra PolnišováЩ

 7 nominations
 Mário Kollár
 Andrej BičanЩ

 6 nominations
 Zdena Studenková
 Michal Dočolomanský
 Jarmila LajčákováЩ
 Richard Müller
 Lucia Barmošová
 Ján MečiarЦ
 Jozef Kubáni

 5 nominations
 Aneta PariškováЦ
 Jana MajeskáЦ
 Stanislav ŠčepánЦ
 Lukáš LatinákЦ
 Monika HilmerováЦ 
 Ján KoleníkЦ
 Ľubomír Bajaník 
 Zuzana ŠebováЦ 
 Kristína

 4 nominations
 Jozef Nodžák 
 Peter MarcinЦ
 Katarína Knechtová
 Alena HeribanováЦ
 Peter Cmorik 
 Ľuboš KostelnýЩ
 Diana MórováЦ
 Tomáš Maštalír 
 Marika Gombitová┼
 Marián Čekovský
 Pavol Fejér 
 Danica Kleinová 
 Celeste Buckingham
 Fragile
 Štefan Eisele 
 Marcel Forgáč
 Adam Ďurica 
 IMT Smile

 3 nominations
 Soňa Müllerová
 Jozef Pročko 
 Miroslav Michalech 
 Katarína Hasprová 
 Miloš Bubán 
 Kamila Magálová
 Misha
 Pavol Habera 
 Jozef Ráž
 Magda Paveleková┼Ц
 Martina ŠimkovičováЦ
 Zuzana Fialová
 Gabriela DzuríkováЩ
 Alexander BártaЦ
 Zuzana TlučkováЦ
 Miriam Šmahel (''née Kalisová) 
 Nela Pocisková
 Helena KrajčiováЦ
 Peter ČamborЦ
 Adriana Kmotríková
 Vladimír Voštinár 
 Michal HudákЦ
 Mária Čírová
 Desmod

 2 nominations
 Peter Kočiš 
 Ivan Tásler 
 Marianna Ďurianová 
 Rastislav Žitný 
 Viktória Ráková 
 Elena VacvalováЦ 
 Jaroslav Zápala 
 Zdenka Predná 
 Patrik Švajda 
 Andrea Pálffy (''née Belányiová) 
 Ján JackuliakЦ
 Mária Chreneková (née Pietrová)
 Juraj Kemka 
 Adam Zavřel 
 Peter Bič Project 
 Kveta Horváthová (née Kmotorková)
 Viktor Vincze
 Daniel Heriban
 Samuel Tomeček
 Veronika Ostrihoňová Cifrová
 Slávo Jurko
 Michal Kubovčík]]Ž
 Tatiana Pauhofová
 Emma Drobná

 1 nomination
 Ľubomír Karásek 
 Ladislav Chudík┼
 Zuzana Kronerová
 Eva Černá
 Milan Markovič 
 Miroslav Noga 
 Anna Šišková
 Július Satinský
 Branislav Ondruš 
 Zuzana Hajdu 
 Dorota Nvotová 
 Emil Horváth┼ 
 Dara Rolins
 Martin Vanekф 
 Igor Adamecф 
 Petra Jurínová 
 Milan Lasica┼ 
 Andy Kraus 
 Peter Batthyany 
 Michaela Čobejová 
 Roman Juraško 
 Erika Barkolová 
 Roman Luknár 
 Martina Kmeťová (alias Tina)
 Zuzana Kanócz 
 Gabriela Mihalčínová (née Marcinková)
 Miroslava Almásy 
 Ego (alias Michal Straka)
 Marcel Chlpík 
 Sabína Grláková 
 Juraj Loj 
 Milan Zimnýkoval
 Elán
 Leona Kočkovičová (née Fučíková)†
 Zuzana Mauréry
 Kristína Kövešová
 Boris Pršo
 Ján Tribula
 Lujza Garajová Schrameková
 Vladimír Kobielsky
 Ondrej Kandráč
 Lukáš Adamec
 Kandráčovci

 Notesф denotes a shared nomination ┼ Denotes an OTO honoree. Ц denotes a nominee in two main categories Щ denotes a nominee in three main categories ЩΓ denotes a nominee in four main categories Ž denotes a winner of the Život Award

Honorees-only

 Jozef Kroner† 
 Katarína Kolníková 
 Eva Krížiková
 Pavol Mikulík
 Mária Kráľovičová
 Karol Machata
 Štefan Kvietik
 Stanislav Dančiak
 Dušan Gabáni
 Juraj Kukura
 Božidara Turzonovová
 Milan Kňažko

 Notes† denotes an in memoriam-honoree

References

External links
 OTO Awards - Winners and nominees (From 2000 onwards)
 OTO Awards - Winners and nominees (From 2000 to 2009)

OTO Awards
Slovak television awards
OTO Awards